Olinto Sampaio Rubini commonly known as Rubini (1934 – 18 September 2012) was a professional footballer who played in the Campeonato Paulista and Mexican Primera División.

Career
Born in Porto Feliz, Rubini played as a center forward. He began his career with local side Atlético Ituano, helping the club with the Campeonato Paulista Série A3 title in 1954 and 1955. Rubini signed with Paulista second division side Esporte Clube São Bento in 1957.

In the summer of 1961, Rubini played with Toronto Roma of the National Soccer League. Rubini was instrumental in having Toronto Roma win the league championship.  He moved to Mexico where he would play in the Primera División for nearly a decade. Initially, he signed with Nacional de Guadalajara, before joining rivals Oro de Guadalajara two seasons later. He scored 17 league goals for Oro in the 1963–64 season. Rubini joined C.F. Monterrey in 1964, scoring 20 league goals in his first season with the club. He played for Monterrey until 1968, when he joined Laguna.

Personal
Rubini died aged 78 in September 2012.

References

1934 births
2012 deaths
Brazilian footballers
Brazilian expatriate footballers
Ituano FC players
Esporte Clube São Bento players
Toronto Roma players
CD Oro footballers
C.F. Monterrey players
Canadian National Soccer League players
Liga MX players
Expatriate footballers in Mexico
Expatriate soccer players in Canada
Brazilian expatriate sportspeople in Canada
Brazilian expatriate sportspeople in Mexico
Association football forwards
People from Porto Felix